Greatest Hits is a compilation album by the English synth-pop band The Human League, released on 31 October 1988 by Virgin Records. It contains 13 singles released by the band, spanning from their debut single (1978's "Being Boiled") to their most recent album at the time (1986's Crash), as well as lead singer Philip Oakey's collaboration with Giorgio Moroder, "Together in Electric Dreams". The album reached No. 3 in the UK.

On 30 October 1995, to cash in on the band's renewed success at that time, Virgin repackaged the album with a new cover and added newer tracks: "Tell Me When" (from the Octopus album) and a new remix of "Don't You Want Me" by German group Snap!. Additionally, a brand-new track, "Stay with Me Tonight", was included which the band had recorded under their new recording contract with EastWest Records. This would later be released as a single.

Track listing
(Virgin HLCD1 - 259 355-222)
 "Mirror Man" (Burden, Callis, Oakey) – 3:49 from Fascination!
 "(Keep Feeling) Fascination" (Callis, Oakey) – 3:43 from Fascination!
 "The Sound of the Crowd" (Burden, Oakey) – 3:56 from Dare 
 "The Lebanon" (Callis, Oakey) – 3:43 from Hysteria
 "Human" (Jimmy Jam and Terry Lewis) – 3:46 from Crash
 "Together in Electric Dreams" (Moroder, Oakey) – 3:53 from Philip Oakey & Giorgio Moroder and Electric Dreams
 "Don't You Want Me" (Callis, Oakey, Wright) – 3:57 from Dare
 "Being Boiled" (Marsh, Oakey, Ware) – 3:38 Non-album single
 "Love Action (I Believe in Love)" (Burden, Oakey) – 3:50 from Dare
 "Louise" (Callis, Oakey, Wright) – 4:55 from Hysteria
 "Open Your Heart" (Callis, Oakey) – 3:55 from Dare
 "Love Is All That Matters" (Jimmy Jam and Terry Lewis) – 4:06 from Crash
 "Life on Your Own" (Callis, Oakey, Wright) – 4:05 from Hysteria

 Note: Track 8 is the original version of "Being Boiled" and was released on the Fast Product Label.
 Note: The Chilean cassette release (EMI Odeón Chilena - Virgin 105575), and the North American CD release (A&M Records - 7502152272) dropped the track "Together in Electric Dreams".

1995 reissue
(Virgin CDV 2792 - 724384094621)
 "Don't You Want Me" (Callis, Oakey, Wright) (1981) – 3:59 from Dare
 "Love Action (I Believe in Love)" (Burden, Oakey) (1981) – 3:52 from Dare
 "Mirror Man" (Burden, Callis, Oakey) (1982) – 3:52 from Fascination!
 "Tell Me When" (Beckett, Oakey) (1994) - 4:43 from Octopus
 "Stay with Me Tonight" (Oakey, Stanley) (1995) - 4:01 Previously unreleased
 "Open Your Heart" (Callis, Oakey) (1981) – 3:56 from Dare
 "(Keep Feeling) Fascination" (Callis, Oakey) (1983) – 3:45 from Fascination!
 "The Sound of the Crowd" (Burden, Oakey) (1981) – 3:57 from Dare
 "Being Boiled" (Marsh, Oakey, Ware) (1978) – 3:39 Non-album single
 "The Lebanon" (Callis, Oakey) (1984) – 3:43 from Hysteria
 "Love Is All That Matters" (Jimmy Jam and Terry Lewis) (1987) – 4:06 from Crash
 "Louise" (Callis, Oakey, Wright) (1984) – 4:57 from Hysteria
 "Life on Your Own" (Callis, Oakey, Wright) (1984) – 4:05 from Hysteria
 "Together In Electric Dreams" (Moroder, Oakey) (1984) – 3:53 from Philip Oakey & Giorgio Moroder and Electric Dreams
 "Human" (Jimmy Jam and Terry Lewis) (1986) – 3:49 from Crash
 "Don't You Want Me" (Snap 7″ Remix) (1995) - 3:58 Previously unreleased

Charts

Weekly charts

Year-end charts

Certifications

Video release

To accompany both the original and repackaged versions of the album Virgin also released a VHS video tape compilation featuring the music videos of the tracks on each album.

References

External links
 Reviews for Greatest Hits

1988 greatest hits albums
1995 greatest hits albums
The Human League albums
Virgin Records compilation albums